Chilchi is a rural locality (a settlement) and the administrative center of Chilchinsky Selsoviet of Tyndinsky District, Amur Oblast, Russia. The population was 190 as of 2018. There are 2 streets.

Geography 
Chilchi is located on the Nyukzha river, 232 km northwest of Tynda (the district's administrative centre) by road. Lopcha is the nearest rural locality.

References 

Rural localities in Tyndinsky District